Tempest Peak is a sharp ice-covered peak (3,410 m) with a subordinate summit (3, 345 in.) just southward, standing 3 nautical miles (6 km) north-northeast of Storm Peak in the Marshall Mountains, Queen Alexandra Range. So named by the New Zealand Geological Survey Antarctic Expedition (NZGSAE) (1961–62) because of the stormy conditions experienced in the area.

See also
Elliot Peak, located 1 nautical mile (2 km) northwest of Tempest Peak
Kip Peak, located 3 kilometres (2 mi) northeast of Tempest Peak

References

Mountains of the Ross Dependency
Shackleton Coast